Cyperus stergiosii is a species of sedge that is native to parts of South America.

See also 
 List of Cyperus species

References 

stergiosii
Plants described in 2013
Flora of Bolivia
Flora of Venezuela